Diplodactylus kenneallyi, sometimes called commonly Kenneally's gecko, is a species of gecko, a lizard in the family Gekkonidae. The species is endemic to Australia.

Etymology
The specific name, kenneallyi, is in honor of Australian botanist Kevin Francis Kenneally (born 1945).

Geographic range
D. kenneallyi is found in the state of Western Australia.

Reproduction
D. kenneallyi is oviparous.

References

Further reading
Cogger HG (2014). Reptiles and Amphibians of Australia, Seventh Edition. Clayton, Victoria, Australia: CSIRO Publishing. xxx + 1,033 pp. .
Storr GM (1988). "Three new Diplodactylus (Lacertilia: Gekkonidae) from the arid zone of Australia". Records of the Western Australian Museum 14 (2): 217–223. (Diplodactylus kenneallyi, new species, pp. 221–222, Figure 4).
Wilson, Steve; Swan, Gerry (2013). A Complete Guide to Reptiles of Australia, Fourth Edition. Sydney: New Holland Publishers. 522 pp. .

Diplodactylus
Reptiles described in 1988
Taxa named by Glen Milton Storr
Geckos of Australia